Confessions of a Pit Fighter is a 2005 American martial arts action film directed by Art Camacho and starring Hector Echavarria, Armand Assante, Flavor Flav, James Russo and John Savage. It was filmed in Los Angeles, California and produced by Alliance Group Entertainment.  It was distributed in by Lions Gate Entertainment.

Synopsis
The embattled mixed martial arts expert, Eddie Castillo, is released from jail after swearing to never enter the pit fighting ring again. However, after his brother is killed in the ring by a vicious new fighter, Eddie goes on a quest for revenge. His journey takes him through the depths of the underground pit fighting circuit, where he finds people like Lucky, who help him; while others, such as the nefarious Argento will stop at nothing to see Eddie fail.

Cast
 Hector Echavarria as Eddie Castillo
 Armand Assante as Argento
 Gizelle D'Cole as Gizelle
 James Russo as Sharkey
 Flavor Flav as Lucky
 John Savage as McGee
 Troy Aguayo as Ivan
 Quinton Jackson as Fighter
 Gustavo Cardozo as Fighter

Reception
Like many Direct-to-DVD movies, Confessions of a Pit Fighter was largely ignored by all major reviewers, and the few who bother review, pointed the lack of creativity of the story.

References

External links
 
 Official Website
 Confessions of a Pit Fighter on MySpace
 Confessions of a Pit Fighter on Alliance Group Entertainment Website

2005 films
2000s action drama films
2005 martial arts films
American action drama films
American martial arts films
Mixed martial arts films
Underground fighting films
2005 drama films
Films directed by Art Camacho
2000s English-language films
2000s American films